Raju Verma is a Punjabi film writer, best known for his Punjabi films Aate di chidi. Verma is a resident of Cheema Mandi village in Sangrur. His films Loud Speaker  and Kainchi Kapda ate Machine are in pre-production stages.

Filmography

References 

Indian screenwriters
Living people
Year of birth missing (living people)